Tekle Fitinsa (born 13 December 1945) is an Ethiopian long-distance runner. He competed in the men's 5000 metres at the 1972 Summer Olympics.

References

External links
 

1945 births
Living people
Athletes (track and field) at the 1972 Summer Olympics
Ethiopian male long-distance runners
Olympic athletes of Ethiopia
Place of birth missing (living people)
20th-century Ethiopian people
21st-century Ethiopian people